The teachings of the Baháʼí Faith regard Buddhism as a religion founded by a Manifestation of God, and Baháʼu'lláh as the expected Maitreya Buddha. The authenticity of the current canon of Buddhist scriptures is seen as uncertain. In recent years there has been an increase in the number of Baháʼís from Buddhist background.

Baháʼí scholarship
The differences between religious concepts in Buddhism and the Abrahamic religions has caused  questions for Baháʼí scholarship. Jamshed Fozdar presents the Buddhist teaching about an unknowable reality as referring to the concept of God, for example in the following passage from the Udana (v.81) in the Khuddaka Nikaya: "There is, O monks, an Unborn, Unoriginated, Uncreated, Unformed. Were there not, O monks, this Unborn, Unoriginated, Uncreated, Unformed, there would be no escape from the world of the born, originated, created, formed. Since, O monks, there is an Unborn, Unoriginated, Uncreated, Unformed, therefore there is an escape from the born, originated, created, formed."

Baháʼí scholar Moojan Momen argues that there are many similarities between the ethical teachings in Theravada Buddhism and the Baháʼí Faith, and that the apparent metaphysical differences originate from culture-bound terminologies. Momen further argues that the Baháʼí teachings uphold all parts of the Noble Eightfold Path: right view, right aim or right-mindedness, right speech, right action, right living or livelihood, right effort or endeavour, right mindfulness and right contemplation.

See also 
 Baháʼí Faith and Hinduism
 Baháʼí Faith and Zoroastrianism
 Religion in India
 Baháʼí Faith in Nepal
 Baháʼí Faith and the unity of religion

References

 
 (short version of this title here).

Further reading
 Buck, Christopher (1980). The Mystery of the Sworded Warrior in Hindu Apocalypse: Was Kalki Visnuyas Baháʼu'lláh?.
 
 Cole, Juan (1996). A Zen Gloss on Baha'u'llah's Commentary on "He who knoweth his self knoweth his Lord".
 Faber, Roland (2017). Baháʼu'lláh and the Luminous Mind: Baháʼí Gloss on a Buddhist Puzzle, in Lights of Irfan 18.

Kluge, Ian. (2006). Buddhism and the Baháʼí Writings: An Ontological Rapprochement.
Kluge, Ian. (2013). The Baháʼí Writings and the Buddhist Doctrine of Emptiness: An Initial Survey.

External links
 ʻAbdu'l-Bahá and Shoghi Effendi. Buddha, Krishna, Zoroaster and Related Subjects, compiled by Research Department of the Universal House of Justice.
 BIC Statement: The Common Goal of Universal Peace in Buddhism and the Baha'i Faith (1990)
Article about Maitreya Buddha, by Christopher Buck
 Prophecy Fulfilled: Buddhist Prophecies

Buddhism
Bahá'í Faith